Moondreams is an album by Brazilian keyboardist Walter Wanderley featuring performances recorded in 1969 and released on the CTI label.

Track listing
 "Asa Branca" (Luiz Gonzaga) - 4:32 
 "L' Amore Dice Ciao" (Armando Trovajoli, Giancarlo Guardagassi, Roger Greenaway) - 2:41 
 "Penha" (Vicente Paiva) - 2:45 
 "One of the Nicer Things" (Jimmy Webb) - 3:10 
 "Proton, Electron, Neutron" (Marcos Valle, Paulo Sérgio Valle) - 2:47 
 "5:30 Plane" (Webb) - 3:42 
 "Soulful Strut" (Eugene Record, Sonny Sanders) - 3:06 
 "Moondreams" (Egberto Gismonti) - 2:31 
 "Jackie, All" (Eumir Deodato) - 3:33 
 "Mirror of Love" (Deodato) - 2:44 
Recorded at Van Gelder Studio in Englewood Cliffs, New Jersey on December 11, 12 & 13, 1968

Personnel
Walter Wanderley - organ, electronic harpsichord
Bernie Glow - trumpet, flugelhorn
Marvin Stamm - flugelhorn
Danny Bank, Hubert Laws, Romeo Penque, Jerome Richardson, Joe Soldo - flute
Jose Marino, Richard Davis, George Duvivier - bass
João Palma - drums
Lulu Ferreira, Airto Moreira - percussion
Flora Purim, Linda November, Stella Stevens, Susan Manchester - vocals
Harold Coletta, Richard Dickler, Theodore Israel, Archie Levin, David Mankovitz, Warren Tekula, Emanuel Vardi, Harry Zaratzian - viola
Eumir Deodato - arranger

Reception

Richard S. Ginell of AllMusic stated "The Wanderley sound is more carefully terraced than ever on this strikingly packaged album".

References

CTI Records albums
Walter Wanderley albums
1969 albums
Albums produced by Creed Taylor
Albums arranged by Eumir Deodato
Albums recorded at Van Gelder Studio